is a Japanese voice actor. He made his debut role as Soichiro Arima in Kare Kano.

Filmography

Television animation
1998
Kareshi Kanojo no Jijō (Soichiro Arima)

2000
Tottoko Hamutarō (Megane-kun and Mr Yoshi)

2001
Dā! Dā! Dā! (Mizuki Yamamura)
Great Dangaioh (Kuya Amagi)

2002
Haibane Renmei (Hyohko)
The Prince of Tennis (Akira Kamio)
Rizelmine (Ryuunosuke Hououin)
Rockman EXE (ElecMan.EXE)

2003
Di Gi Charat Nyo! (Ky Schweitzer)

2004
Elfen Lied (Kouta)
Desert Punk (Sunabōzu/Kanta Mizuno)
Fantastic Children (Palza)

2005
Amaenaideyo!! (Ikkou Satonaka)
Angel Heart (Liu Xin Hong)
Cluster Edge (Chrome Team No. 2)

2006
Buso Renkin (Shi)
Makai Senki Disgaea (Vyers)
Pumpkin Scissors (Warrant Officer Machs)
Sumomomo Momomo (Hanzō)

2007
Bakugan Battle Brawlers (Shun)
Heroic Age (Mehitaka Pore)
Ōkiku Furikabutte (Yūto Sakaeguchi)

2008
Nintama Rantarou (Tomesaburou Kema)
Tales of the Abyss (Luke fon Fabre, Asch the Bloody)

2009
Bakugan Battle Brawlers: New Vestroia (Shun)
Hipira (Georuge)

2010
Katanagatari (Kōmori Maniwa)
Bakugan Battle Brawlers: Gundalian Invaders (Shun)
Inazuma Eleven (Dylan Keith)

2012
Monsuno (Bren)

2013
Kill la Kill (Suzuki)
Meganebu! (Tetsu Suzuki)

2014
Free! - Eternal Summer (Shigino Kisumi)
PriPara (Kuma)

2017
Yu-Gi-Oh! VRAINS (Windy)

2018
Free! - Dive to the Future (Shigino Kisumi)

2022
Reiwa no Di Gi Charat (Ky Schweitzer)

Original video animation
Ichi the Killer (2002) (Ichi)
Voices of a Distant Star (2002) (Noboru Terao)
Angel's Feather (2006) (Chris Ousaka)

Theatrical animation
Neppu Kairiku Bushi Road (2013) (Kagato Maeda)
High Speed! -Free! Starting Days- (2015) (Shigino Kisumi)

Video games
Apocripha/0 (2001) (Platina Pastenr)
Suto*Mani: Strobe*Mania (2011) (Ritsu Rokuka)
Arknights (2019) Steward
Mahoutsukai no Yakusoku (2019) Snow

Unknown date
Angel's Feather (Chris Ousaka)
Disgaea: Hour of Darkness (Vyers)
Disgaea 2: Cursed Memories (Tink)
Disgaea 3: Absence of Justice (Master Big Star)
Laughter Land (Sergi)
Lucian Bee's Justice Yellow Didie Lightnorth
Rockman EXE Transmission (ElecMan.EXE)
Star Ocean: First Departure (T'nique Arcana)
Super Robot Wars UX (Agnes Berge)
Sweet Fuse: At Your Side (Makoto Mikami)
Tales of the Abyss (Luke fon Fabre, Asch the Bloody)
Tales of the World: Radiant Mythology (Luke fon Fabre)
Teikoku Sensenki (Ki Syaraku)
Tokimeki Memorial Girl's Side: 2nd Kiss (Itaru Hikami)
Tokyo Babel (Hagane Oshiba)
Wand Of Fortune Noel Valmore
Wand Of Fortune Mirai e no Prologue Noel Valmore
Wand Of Fortune II Jikuu ni Shizumu Mokushiroku Noel Valmore
Wand Of Fortune II FD Kimi ni Sasageru Epilogue Noel Valmore
Zettai Fukuju Meirei (Timo Wilkes)

Drama CDs

Aisaresugite Kodoku series 1: Aisaresugite Kodoku (Fukami Oozora)
Aisaresugite Kodoku series 2: Itoshisugita Shifuku (Fukami Oozora)
Angel Game series 1: Angel Game Zenhen (Fumihiko Kaiya)
Angel Game series 2: Angel Game Kouhen (Fumihiko Kaiya)
Answer series 1 (Yukio Hatano)
Answer series 2: Suggestion (Yukio Hatano)
Corsair series (Canale Dellacqua)
Datenshi Game series 1: Datenshi Game Zenhen (Fumihiko Kaiya)
Datenshi Game series 2: Datenshi Game Kouhen (Fumihiko Kaiya)
Honoka na Koi no Danpen wo (Nanaki)
Junk!Boys (Takato Kajimoto)
Munasawagi series (Kazuhide Sawada)
Ourin Gakuen series 3: Sekushi Boizu de Sasayaide (Shuuichirou Kazama)
Rossellini Ke no Musuko Ryakudatsusha (Luca Ernesto Rossellini)
Scarlet (Harumi)
Te wo Nobaseba Haruka na Umi (Seiji Fujige)
Three Wolves Mountain (Jirou Tsukihara)
TV-kun no Kimochi (Takumi Sudou)
Wagamama Ouji ni Goyoujin (Tomoya Kurabashi)
Yoromeki Banchou (Shinpei Wakaba)

Tokusatsu
2006
GoGo Sentai Boukenger (Grand Beast Rei/Quester Rei (eps. 17-18 (Nomal), 19 - 20, 23, 28, 31, 33-34, 36, 39 - 42  (Quester))
GoGo Sentai Boukenger the Movie: The Greatest Precious (Quester Rei)
2007
Kamen Rider Den-O (Spider Imagin (Red Eye, Green Eye) (ep. 25 - 26))
2008
Kamen Rider Den-O & Kiva: Climax Deka (Clown Imagin)
Engine Sentai Go-onger (Savage Land Barbaric Machine Beast Drill Banki (ep. 32 - 33))
2009
Samurai Sentai Shinkenger (Ayakashi Hyakuyappa (ep. 18))
2010
Tensou Sentai Goseiger (Yuumajuu Waraikozou of the Gremlin (ep. 21))

Dubbing roles

Live-action
Alien 3 (2005 Blu-ray edition) (Golic (Paul McGann))

Animation
Tasty Time with ZeFronk (ZeFronk)

References

External links
Official website 
Official agency profile 

1977 births
Living people
Male voice actors from Yamagata Prefecture
Japanese male video game actors
Japanese male voice actors
21st-century Japanese male actors